1919 Paddington state by-election may refer to:

 1919 Paddington state by-election 1, held on 24 May 1919 due to the resignation of John Osborne
 1919 Paddington state by-election 2, held on 26 July 1919 due to the death of Lawrence O'Hara

See also
 List of New South Wales state by-elections